The Battle of Brisbane was a riot in Brisbane, Queensland between United States military personnel and Australian servicemen and civilians.

Battle of Brisbane may also refer to:

"Battle of Brisbane" (song), song from The Pogues album Red Roses for Me
Battle of Brisbane (boxing match), alternative name for boxing match Manny Pacquiao vs. Jeff Horn
Battle of Brisbane (1932 rugby league match), the second rugby league test match between Australia and England in 1932